The UCS Swedish Open 2016 is the 2016 Swedish Open, which is a tournament of the PSA World Tour event International (prize money: $70,000). The event took place in Linköping in Sweden from 4 February to 7 February. Karim Abdel Gawad won his first Swedish Open trophy, beating Tarek Momen in the final.

Prize money and ranking points
For 2016, the prize purse was $70,000. The prize money and points breakdown is as follows:

Seeds

Draw and results

See also
2015 PSA World Tour
Swedish Open (squash)

References

External links
PSA Case Swedish Open 2016 website
Case Swedish Open official website
Case Swedish Open SquashSite website

Squash tournaments in Sweden
Swedish Open Squash
2016 in Swedish sport